Erika Polmar is an agritourism entrepreneur and food industry activist in Oregon. She founded Plate & Pitchfork, a Farm Dinner series, and helped lead the effort to lobby for governmental relief for small food-industry businesses during the 2020 coronavirus pandemic.

Early life and education 
Polmar has a degree in communications from St. Louis University.

Career 
Polmar began her career  selling advertising for the Willamette Week She opened the Portland office of citysearch.com and continued to work in technology product development until September of 2001.Days after the layoff she was working at a winery sorting grapes when she learned that a group of Portland chefs were planning a fundraiser for children orphaned by the 9/11 terrorist attacks and needed an organizer. She produced the event, Flux, which was a success, and through the experience made contacts in the local food and wine industry.

Polmar founded Plate & Pitchfork farm dinners with Emily Berreth in 2003.  The dinners addressed the disconnect between Americans and the food system while raising money to end  food insecurity. Each dinner is held outdoors in a local farmer's field and features a menu planned and prepared by two local chefs using product from that farm and wines from a local winery.
,   

In 2010 Berreth stepped away from the project and Polmar grew the business to offer  added hands-on cooking class events, rafting trips with chef-prepared local foods and agritourism consulting.
 

During the 2020 coronavirus pandemic Polmar led local and national efforts to lobby local, state, and federal governments for relief for small food-related businesses in the Northwest and the US. She was a founding member and leadership team member of the Independent Restaurant Coalition.  

In June of 2020 Erika became the Executive Director of the Independent Restaurant Coalition. She continues to serve as an Advisor to the Independent Restaurant Alliance of Oregon, a member of the Oregon Agritourism Network leadership team and a Member of the Board of Slow Food Wallowas.

Personal life 
Polmar moved to Oregon after graduating from college.

References 

Saint Louis University alumni
Activists from Ohio
Activists from Portland, Oregon
Businesspeople from Ohio
Businesspeople from Portland, Oregon
21st-century American businesswomen
21st-century American businesspeople
Living people
Year of birth missing (living people)